"Since I've Been Loving You" is a song by the English rock band Led Zeppelin, released in 1970 on the album Led Zeppelin III.

Overview
"Since I've Been Loving You" was one of the first songs prepared for the Led Zeppelin III album. The song was recorded live in the studio with very little overdubbing. It was reportedly the hardest to record.

John Paul Jones played Hammond organ on the song, using the bass pedals instead of a bass guitar. John Bonham's preferred drum pedal, the Ludwig Speed King model 201, squeaks during the recording, and has been called the "Squeak King".

The opening and closing lyrics of "Since I've Been Loving You" are nearly identical to the 1968 Moby Grape song "Never". The song is a slow blues in the key of C minor.

Reception and accolades
In a contemporary review of Led Zeppelin III, Lester Bangs of Rolling Stone wrote that the track "represents the obligatory slow and lethally dull seven-minute blues jam." Robert Christgau was more enthusiastic in Newsday; "with John Paul Jones providing a great thick wall of organ behind Plant and Page", he regarded it as "the ultimate power blues".

Years later, guitarist Joe Satriani enthused: "'Since I've Been Loving You' was a perfect example of taking a blues structure but striking out on your own. They were breaking ground, not copying. I love that Page would always just go for it. Some other guitarist might have better technique, but what Page did would always trump it because the spirit was so overwhelming. Whatever he did would turn into a technique." Audio engineer Terry Manning called it "The best rock guitar solo of all time."

(*) designates unordered lists.

See also
List of cover versions of Led Zeppelin songs
List of Led Zeppelin songs written or inspired by others

References

External links
"Since I've Been Loving You" at ledzeppelin.com

1970 songs
Led Zeppelin songs
Song recordings produced by Jimmy Page
Songs written by Jimmy Page
Songs written by Robert Plant
Songs written by John Paul Jones (musician)